On 18 January 2020, a suicide car bombing killed four and injured at least 20 others in Afgooye, approximately  from the Somali capital, Mogadishu. Most of the casualties were police officers protecting Turkish contractors building a road. The al-Qaeda-linked extremist group al-Shabaab claimed responsibility for the attack.

Background 
Al-Shabaab began as the armed wing of the Islamic Courts Union (ICU), which later splintered into several smaller factions after its defeat in 2006 by Somalia's Transitional Federal Government (TFG) and the TFG's Ethiopian military allies. 

The group often carries out attacks in Somalia, especially in and around Mogadishu. It less frequently attacks other African countries which support Somalia, especially neighbouring Kenya. Al-Shabaab carries out attacks to try to undermine Somalia's central government, which is backed by the United Nations and African Union peacekeeping troops, (AMISOM). On 14 October 2017, the worst attack by the organization killed more than 500 people with two bomb explosions that targeted Somalia's capital city Mogadishu.

Turkish involvement in Somalia 

Turkey is a large donor of humanitarian aid and reconstruction to Somalia. Turkey maintained an embassy in Mogadishu, Somalia's capital, until the outbreak of the Somali Civil War in 1991. During the drought of 2011, Turkey contributed over $201 million to the humanitarian relief efforts in the impacted parts of Somalia. Turkey assisted in the building of several hospitals, and helped renovate and rehabilitate the Aden Adde International Airport and the National Assembly building, among other initiatives.

Attack 
A Somali police commander said the intended target was Turkish construction workers. The suicide bomber sped into an area where the engineers and police were having lunch. Local witnesses described a "massive explosion" and "clouds of smoke". The casualties were mostly police officers providing security. Following the attack, al-Shabab issued a statement, "We are behind the martyrdom of the suicide car bomb in Afgoye".

Reactions 
The Turkish Ministry of National Defense wrote on Twitter: "We curse and condemn in the strongest terms the bomb terror attack which targeted innocent civilians in Somalia".

References

2020 murders in Somalia
21st-century mass murder in Somalia
Al-Shabaab (militant group) attacks
Islamic terrorist incidents in 2020
Lower Shabelle
Mass murder in 2020
Somalia–Turkey relations
Suicide bombings in 2020
Suicide car and truck bombings in Somalia
Terrorist incidents in Somalia in 2020